Mons (or ) is a commune in the Var department in the Provence-Alpes-Côte d'Azur region in southeastern France.

Geography
This explains the variety of different scenery found on the territory of the commune, as well as the diversity of its vegetation, but also accounts for the fact that it is sparsely cultivated. There are exceptional views from the village (from the Place Saint Sebastien), ranging from Menton to the East all the way to Toulon in the West.

Transportation

Personalities related to the municipality
Famous members of the Villeneuve family, including:
 a saint : Saint Roseline.

Other personalities related to the municipality :
 Pierre Hemmer, one of the Internet pioneers in Switzerland, deceased in Mons.

Miscellaneous
The strong, distinctive character of the village of Mons, its calm and beauty have made it the jewel of Varois hinterland, situated as it is, at the confines of the Gavot uplands. The Monsois have had to grapple with adversity over the centuries: their tenacity and courage has forged them into a hardy, solid community, and they bear the nickname of "Chinois de Provence" (the Chinese of Provence).

See also
Communes of the Var department

References

Communes of Var (department)